The 1988 Missouri lieutenant gubernatorial election was held on November 8, 1988. Democratic nominee Mel Carnahan defeated Republican nominee Richard B. "R.B." Grisham with 51.81% of the vote.

Primary elections
Primary elections were held on August 2, 1988.

Democratic primary

Candidates
Mel Carnahan, State Treasurer of Missouri
Bill Kimmons
Steven Jacques
Prentess E. Clifton Sr.

Results

Republican primary

Candidates
Richard B. "R.B." Grisham, State Representative
Derek Holland, State Representative
James A. "Jim" Noland Jr., former State Senator
Dick Baalmann
Gordon W. Neilson

Results

General election

Candidates
Major party candidates
Mel Carnahan, Democratic
Richard B. "R.B." Grisham, Republican

Other candidates
Richard Rosenberg, Libertarian

Results

References

1988
Missouri
Gubernatorial